Yu (Jade) Morton is a professor in the Department of Aerospace Engineering Sciences at the University of Colorado, Boulder. She was a professor in the Department of Electrical and Computer Engineering at Colorado State University from 2014 to 2017, and at Miami University of Ohio from 2000 to 2014.

Morton was named a Fellow of the Institute of Electrical and Electronics Engineers (IEEE) in 2014 for her contributions to the understanding of ionospheric effects on global navigation satellite signals.

References 

Fellow Members of the IEEE
Living people
21st-century American engineers
Year of birth missing (living people)
American electrical engineers